Tubonasus (meaning “tube nose”) is an extinct monospecific genus of long-snouted arthrodire placoderm from the Early Frasnian stage of the Late Devonian period, found at the Gogo Formation of Kimberley, Western Australia.

Tubonasus is interpreted as a pelagic pursuit predator, and had the abillity of swallowing prey whole. Like other camuropiscids, it has an elongated rostrum, streamlined body, and narrow infragnathals.

Phylogeny
Tubonasus is a member of the family Camuropiscidae under the superfamily Incisoscutoidea, which belongs to the clade Coccosteomorphi, one of the two major clades within Eubrachythoraci. The cladogram below shows the phylogeny of Tubonasus:

References

Camuropiscidae